Li Zheng (born 25 Mai 2000) is a Chinese diver.

Li won all four legs of the 2017 FINA Diving World Series in the 3 metre springboard mixed synchronized event together with Wang Han. At the 2017 World Aquatics Championships in Budapest Li and Wang became world champions in mixed synchronized diving from the 3 metre springboard.

In 2018 Li and Wang won gold at the 2018 FINA Diving World Cup. Li also participated in the 2018 FINA World Junior Diving Championships, where he won gold at the synchronized diving 10 metre platform event together with Lian Junjie, silver at the 1 metre springboard event and bronze at the 10 metre platform event.

References 

2000 births
Living people
Chinese male divers
World Aquatics Championships medalists in diving
21st-century Chinese people